Angelo Agostini (April 8, 1843 – January 23, 1910) was an Italian-born Brazilian illustrator, journalist and founder of several publications, and although born in Italy, is considered the first Brazilian cartoonist.

Biography

Agostini was born in Vercelli, Italy, but following adolescence and art studies in Paris, he arrived in Brazil in 1859 with his mother the singer Raquel Agostini, and settled.

At an early age he published drawn work in the São Paulo publication Diabo Coxo on September 17, of 1864. Following more work published in Cabrião and Revista Arlequim, Agostini produced a sequential image story serialised in Vida Fluminense titled As Aventuras de Nhô Quim (The Adventures of Nhô Quim). The first chapter published on January 30, 1869, the story involved themes of conflict between the agricultural and urban culture, and political commentary through visual storytelling capable of reaching a largely illiterate population.

During the 1880s Agostini started the periodical Revista Illustrada, which became noted for its illustrated coverage of the annual Carnival. On January 27, 1883, the first chapter of As Aventuras do Zé Caipora (The Adventures of Zé Caipora) was published, starting a successful publication run of 35 episodes spread out over many years,. Achieving a multimedia impact, the series was printed in four editions, and inspired a popular song and two silent films. 

Agostini established the magazine Don Quixote in 1895, which lasted until 1906, and with Luiz Bartolomeu de Sousa e Silva founded the influential youth magazine O Tico-Tico for publisher O Malho in 1905. During his final years he worked for the magazine O Malho, until his death in 1910.

Legacy
Named in honour of Agostini, the Prêmio Angelo Agostini is a Brazilian comics prize awarded by Associação dos Quadrinhistas e Caricaturistas do Estado de São Paulo since 1985.

Bibliography 
 As Aventuras de Nhô Quim (1869)
 As Aventuras do Zé Caipora (1883)
 História de Pai João (1906)
 A Arte de Formar Brasileiros (1906)

Sources

External links

Angelo Agostini biography on Lambiek Comiclopedia
O carnaval visto por Angelo Agostini 

1843 births
1910 deaths
People from Vercelli
Italian emigrants to Brazil
Brazilian illustrators
Brazilian journalists
Male journalists
Prêmio Angelo Agostini winners